Inside Politics is a political talk show, broadcast on CNN. Originally hosted by Catherine Crier and Bernard Shaw, and then Shaw and Judy Woodruff, the show ran from 1992–2005 before being cancelled. The program was revived in 2014 with John King as host. What was a Sunday morning talk show was then expanded to additional weekday broadcasts in 2016. Abby Phillip began hosting the Sunday editions in 2021 while King continues to host on the weekdays.

The show is broadcast weekdays noon to 1:00pm ET on CNN from CNN's studios in Washington D.C. The Sunday broadcast airs at 8:00am ET.

History

First incarnation 
The show was originally broadcast for more than 10 years. From 1993 to its cancellation in June 2005, Judy Woodruff was the co-host and then host. She did not renew her contract and joined the PBS NewsHour in 2006.

Second incarnation 
In January 2014, the network announced that Inside Politics would return beginning Sunday, February 2, 2014, hosted by CNN's chief national correspondent, John King.

Following the success, the Sunday morning program was expanded into an hour, as well as additional weekday broadcast at noon ET, since September 26, 2016 (announced in August 2016). However, during certain times, the weekday edition of the program might be pre-empted by CNN Newsroom, the program that both precedes and succeeds Inside Politics. One of the major example were during the COVID-19 pandemic in 2020, where cable news ratings skyrocketed. Due to the need of more hard news coverage of the pandemic and lack of political news, Inside Politics was pre-empted by CNN Newsroom during that 12:00 p.m. hour. However, John King remained as the host for that block of CNN Newsroom.

Inside Politics Sunday with Abby Phillip 
In January 2021, CNN announced that Abby Phillip would take over as the host of the weekend edition of the show. As for that change, the weekend program was rebranded as Inside Politics Sunday with Abby Phillip, while John King remains as host of the weekday edition.

The show is broadcast on Sundays 8:00am to 9:00am ET on CNN and CNN International from CNN's studios in Washington D.C.

References

External links 

CNN.com - Transcripts - Inside Politics

1980s American television news shows
1990s American television news shows
2000s American television news shows
1980s American political television series
1990s American political television series
2000s American political television series
2005 American television series endings
2010s American television news shows
2010s American political television series
2014 American television series debuts
2020s American television news shows
2020s American political television series
CNN original programming
English-language television shows
American Sunday morning talk shows
American television series revived after cancellation